WVLZ (106.1 MHz) is a commercial FM radio station based in Oliver Springs, Tennessee that broadcasts to the Knoxville, Tennessee radio market.

Previously known as WJRV, the station aired a hot adult contemporary music format branded as "106.1 The River".

On May 27, 2020, it was announced that the station was to be acquired by Loud Media.

On June 26, 2020, Loud Media launched 106.1 VLZ with an active rock format.

The station changed call letters on July 1, 2020 to WVLZ

References

External links
VLZ's website

VLZ (FM)
Radio stations established in 2009
2009 establishments in Tennessee
Active rock radio stations in the United States